Igor Dzyuba (born 13 April 1972) is a Soviet former cyclist. He competed in the team time trial at the 1992 Summer Olympics for the Unified Team.

References

External links
 

1972 births
Living people
Uzbekistani male cyclists
Soviet male cyclists
Olympic cyclists of the Unified Team
Cyclists at the 1992 Summer Olympics
Sportspeople from Tashkent